The Charmkins is a television special based on an early 1980s toyline by Hasbro, which was broadcast on 
October 25, 1983.

Plot 
Brown-Eyed Susan and the other Charmkin children of Charmworld go on a quest to rescue Lady Slipper after she is kidnapped by Evil Dragonweed and whisked off to Thistledown to dance for him and his goons.

Cast 
The voice cast included:
 Ben Vereen as Dragonweed
 Aileen Quinn as Brown-Eyed Susan
 Sally Struthers as Poison Ivy
 Ivy Austin as Skunkweed
 Martin Biersban as Willie Winkle
 Bob Kaliban as Bramble Brother #2
 Lyn Lambert as Lady Slipper
 Chris Murney as Briarpatch, Crocus, Bramble Brother #1
 Peter Waldren as Popcorn
 Freddi Weber as Blossom
 Gary Yudman as Thorny
 Patience Jarvis as Announcer
 Tina Capland as Announcer

Home media 
Family Home Entertainment released the special on VHS in the 1980s.

References

External links 
 
 

1983 films
1983 television films
American children's films
Films based on Hasbro toys
Sunbow Entertainment films
Television specials by Marvel Productions
1980s American films